The 2020–21 RC Strasbourg Alsace season was the club's 115th season in existence and the fourth consecutive season in the top flight of French football. In addition to the domestic league, Strasbourg participated in this season's edition of the Coupe de France. The season covered the period from 1 July 2020 to 30 June 2021.

Players

First-team squad

Out on loan

Transfers

In

Out

Pre-season and friendlies

Competitions

Overview

Ligue 1

League table

Results summary

Results by round

Matches
The league fixtures were announced on 9 July 2020.

Coupe de France

Statistics

Goalscorers

References

External links

RC Strasbourg Alsace seasons
Strasbourg